Emily Simonoff is Professor of Child and Adolescent Psychiatry in the Child and Adolescent Mental Health Services (CAMHS) Neuropsychiatry Service, head of the Child and Adolescent Psychiatry department at the Institute of Psychiatry and lead for the CAMHS Clinical Academic Group at King's Health Partners, King's College London.

Career and research 
Simonoff is chair of the Mental Health Research Network for treatment of children with mental health problems and a member of the NICE guideline development group for treatment and diagnosis of autism in children and adolescents. She is on the editorial board of British Journal of Psychiatry.

She is a Fellow of the Royal College of Psychiatrists and a Senior Investigator at the National Institute for Health and Care Research (NIHR).

Selected publications
 Simonoff, Emily, Catherine RG Jones, Andrew Pickles, Francesca Happé, Gillian Baird, and Tony Charman. "Severe mood problems in adolescents with autism spectrum disorder." Journal of Child Psychology and Psychiatry 53, no. 11 (2012): 1157–1166. 
 Charman, Tony, Andrew Pickles, Emily Simonoff, Susie Chandler, Tom Loucas, and Gillian Baird. "IQ in children with autism spectrum disorders: data from the Special Needs and Autism Project (SNAP)." Psychological medicine 41, no. 03 (2011): 619–627. 
 Angold, Adrian, Michael Prendergast, Anthony Cox, R. Harrington, Emily Simonoff, and Michael Rutter. "The child and adolescent psychiatric assessment (CAPA)." Psychological medicine 25, no. 4 (1995): 739–754.

References

British women academics
Academics of King's College London
NIHR Senior Investigators
Fellows of the Royal College of Psychiatrists
British child psychiatrists
British women psychiatrists

Living people
Year of birth missing (living people)